Yuk-ling Yung is an American scientist who has been a Professor of Planetary Science at the California Institute of Technology from 1986 to present.

Biography

Education

He was educated at the University of California, Berkeley earning B.S. in Engineering Physics, with honors, and at Harvard University, acquiring a Ph.D. in Physics in 1974.

Specialization
Yung specializes in the physics and chemistry of planetary atmospheres. He has worked on a number of NASA projects including Galileo, Cassini-Huygens, and the Earth Observing System.

Awards
He won the NASA Exceptional Scientific Achievement Medal in 2004 and  became the first Taiwanese winner of the Kuiper Award in 2015. He is cited in the American Men and Women of Science.

Research
In an article in journal Science, it was reported that planetary science professor Yuk Yung, along with physics research scientist Tracey Tromp, Assistant Professor of Geochemistry John Eiler,  planetary science research scientist Run-Lie Shia, and Jet Propulsion Laboratory scientist Mark Allen, were concerned that leaked hydrogen gas for use in hydrogen cars, in a hydrogen economy, could indirectly cause as much as a 10-percent decrease in atmospheric ozone.

California Institute of Technology report that the leaked hydrogen gas that would inevitably result from a hydrogen economy, if it accumulates, could indirectly cause as much as a 10-percent decrease in atmospheric ozone.

Related scientists
His climate and space research relates to the work of Professor Kenneth J. Hsu (Swiss Federal Institute of Technology), Dr. Charles A Perry (United States Geological Survey) and Henrik Svensmark (Danish Meteorological Institute), in particular in the field of carbon-fluxing.

Publications
As of 2015, he is the author of more than 300 scholarly papers and two books:
 Atmospheric Radiation: Theoretical Basis, R.M. Goody and Y.L. Yung, Oxford University Press, New York, 1989.
 Photochemistry of Planetary Atmospheres, Y.L. Yung and W. D. DeMore, Oxford University Press, 1999.

References

External links
Yuk L. Yung official site
Dr. Yung’s bibliography

Living people
California Institute of Technology faculty
UC Berkeley College of Engineering alumni
Harvard Graduate School of Arts and Sciences alumni
Planetary scientists
Chinese emigrants to the United States
Year of birth missing (living people)